Vincenzo Riolo (February 14, 1772 in Palermo, Sicily – July 5, 1837) was an Italian painter of the Neoclassical style, active mainly in his native Sicily.

Biography
He trained in Palermo initially with Antonio Manno and Francesco Sozzi, but at the age of twenty moved to Rome to work under Giovanni Battista Wicar. Among his contemporaries in Palermo was Giuseppe Patania.

He married Anna, the daughter of the painter Giuseppe Velasquez in Palermo. In 1828, he replaced his father in law as professor at the Regia Accademia del Nudo in Palermo. Riolo died during the Cholera epidemic of 1837, and was replaced as professor by another pupil of Velasco, Salvatore Lo Forte.

He painted a portrait of his friend, Vincenzo Monti. Among other works, he painted frescoes in the Palazzo Tasca and Gangi, in the Real Casino (Villa) della Favorita, the church of Sant'Ignazio all'Olivella, and the Royal Palace (Reggia) of Ficuzza. He died in 1837 during a cholera epidemic in Palermo

References

1772 births
1837 deaths
18th-century Italian painters
Italian male painters
19th-century Italian painters
Painters from Palermo
Burials at San Domenico, Palermo
19th-century Italian male artists
18th-century Italian male artists